The 2017–18 Coppa Titano was the 60th version of the football competition. This competition began on 26 September 2017. The winners of the Coppa Titano, La Fiorita, earned a place in the 2018–19 Europa League and would begin play in the preliminary round.

S. P. Tre Penne were the defending champions after winning the previous season by defeating S.P. La Fiorita in the final by the score of 2–0.

Format
The fifteen clubs from San Marino were drawn into four groups on 19 August 2017. The winners and runners-up from each group advanced to the knockout stage.

Group stage
The clubs played six matches against the other clubs in their group. In groups A, B, and C the clubs played each other twice. In group D the clubs played each other three times.

Group A

Group B

Group C

Group D

Matches 1–4

Matches 5–6

Knockout stage

Quarter-final

Semi-final

Final

See also
 2017–18 Campionato Sammarinese di Calcio

External links
 official site (Italian)
 uefa.com

References

Coppa Titano seasons
San Marino
Coppa Titano